Kosmos 634 ( meaning Cosmos 634), also known as DS-P1-Yu No.67, was a Soviet satellite which was launched in 1974 as part of the Dnepropetrovsk Sputnik programme. It was a  spacecraft, which was built by the Yuzhnoye Design Bureau, and was used as a radar calibration target for anti-ballistic missile tests.

The launch of Kosmos 634 took place from Site 133/1 at the Plesetsk Cosmodrome, and used a Kosmos-2I 63SM carrier rocket. It occurred at 16:05 UTC on 5 March 1974, and resulted in the satellite successfully reaching low Earth orbit. Upon reaching orbit, the satellite was assigned its Kosmos designation, and received the International Designator 1974-012A. The North American Aerospace Defense Command assigned it the catalogue number 07211.

Kosmos 634 was the sixty-ninth of seventy nine DS-P1-Yu satellites to be launched, and the sixty-third of seventy two to successfully reach orbit. It remained in orbit until it decayed and reentered the atmosphere on 9 October 1974.

See also

1974 in spaceflight

References

1974 in spaceflight
Kosmos satellites
Spacecraft launched in 1974
Dnepropetrovsk Sputnik program